Pediatric Diabetes is an academic journal published by ISPAD. It published articles related to diabetes mellitus in children and adolescents.

References

Publications established in 2000
Pediatrics journals
Endocrinology journals
Wiley-Blackwell academic journals